Teluk Sengat is a small town in Kota Tinggi District, Johor, Malaysia. The main economic activity in this town is fishing. There are also palm oil estate nearby and a remote village named Kampung Guntong Nanas.

References

Kota Tinggi District
Towns in Johor